Vincent "Chot" P. Reyes (born August 1, 1963) is a Filipino basketball head coach for the Philippine national basketball team, where he led the team to a historic silver medal finish at the 2013 FIBA Asia Championship and the subsequent appearance at the 2014 FIBA World Cup, the country's first in 36 years. Reyes is a five-time PBA Coach of the Year. He is the President of TV5 Network, Inc. (from October 3, 2016, to June 2, 2019, replacing Noel Lorenzana) and president of Media5, which served as the sales and marketing arm of TV5. Formerly, he was the head of Sports5, TV5's Sports division until 2015 and Digital5 (now D5 Studio).

Professional coaching career
Reyes was one of Tim Cone's assistant coaches during the early 90s with the Alaska Milkmen. Then only 27, Reyes took over the coaching for the Milkmen during the 1991 All-Filipino Conference as Cone was barred from coaching due to a case filed by the Basketball Coaches Association of the Philippines questioning Cone's hiring over other Filipinos. Reyes steered the Alaska franchise to third-place finish in after beating San Miguel in a best-of-three series.

In 1993, Reyes was hired head coach of the Coney Island Ice Cream Stars, now known as the Purefoods Tender Juicy Giants. In his first conference, he led the Ice Cream Stars that was bannered by Alvin Patrimonio and Jerry Codiñera to a 4–2 series win over the San Miguel Beermen to win the All-Filipino Conference, creating history by being the youngest coach to win a championship in his first tournament at age 29. This feat led him to win his first Coach-of-the-Year award. In 1994, he again led the Purefoods to the Commissioner's Cup title over the Alaska Milkmen with Kenny Redfield as import.

Reyes spent two more seasons with the Purefoods franchise before he was hired in 1997 by the Sta. Lucia Realtors. That year, he led the Realtors to a third-place finish in the All-Filipino and two respectable fourth-place finishes in the Commissioner's and Governor's Cup.

However, he left the team in 1998 to join the newly formed Metropolitan Basketball Association. During his short time, he introduced some innovative yet criticized rules such as the Free-Three, the 23-second shot clock, and the eight second backcourt rule. Two years later, however, FIBA adopted the eight second backcourt rule which is in effect today, both for the international and pro game. After a while, he became the assistant coach of Tim Cone for the Philippine Centennial Team that went home with the bronze medal in the 1998 Asian Games.

In 2000, Reyes became the new head coach of the Pop Cola Panthers, spending two seasons there. After a frustrating first season, he led the Panthers to a third-place finish in the 2001 All-Filipino Cup, with a rebuilt lineup of Rudy Hatfield, Johnny Abarrientos, and Poch Juinio. The Pop Cola franchise was then sold to food conglomerate San Miguel Corporation and was renamed as the Coca-Cola Tigers. The SMC management retained Reyes as coach and that year he led a Tigers team, depleted with the injuries of Abarrientos and Jeffrey Cariaso, to the 2002 PBA All-Filipino title – again creating history by being the first team in the PBA's history to win a title in its rookie year. Again, this feat led to Reyes' winning his second PBA Coach-of-the Year award. In 2003, he led Coke to three successive Finals appearances, winning the Reinforced Conference championship with Artemus McClary as import. This in turn led to his third Coach-of-the-Year award, thus becoming the only coach to win 3 COY awards thus far.

Philippine national team

After the PBA and the Basketball Association of the Philippines agreed to a memorandum, the PBA hired Reyes as the coach of Team Pilipinas, a team composed of several professional and collegiate players. Reyes started the program in 2005, leading Team Pilipinas to a fifth-place finish in the FIBA-Asia Champions Cup, third-place in the William Jones Cup and the title in the 2005 Brunei Sultan Cup. Reyes confirmed that he is ready to be one of Toroman's coaching staff for Asian Games 2010 in China.

However, the suspension of the national team by FIBA (which has since been lifted) had hindered the preparation of the team.

In the 2006 William Jones Cup, Team Pilipinas finished a dismal sixth place in the tournament. It was due to the lack of player availabilities. Because of the uncertainty brought about by the FIBA suspension, many PBA players declined the invitation to participate. Instead, then-incoming pros LA Tenorio, Joseph Yeo, Abby Santos, Arwind Santos and several PBA players played in the Jones Cup squad. With the return of his core players to the national team, however, Reyes led Team Pilipinas to a 2-game sweep of Lebanon, which beat Venezuela and France in the 2006 World Championships in Japan. Reyes' team then went on the defend its title in the 2006 Brunei Sultan Cup via a rare 7-game sweep.

After the Brunei Cup, Team Pilipinas was left for a while awaiting the lifting of the FIBA suspension that was handed down since 2005. However, with the approval of the Samahang Basketbol ng Pilipinas as the new national sport association for basketball in the country, Reyes returned as the coach of the national squad.

On October 30, 2014, Reyes was removed as the head coach of the Philippine national team after the disbandment of the current roster, Samahang Basketbol ng Pilipinas head Manny V. Pangilinan said that there will be a new national team that will be formed by a pool by PBA commissioner Chito Salud.

On October 18, 2016, SBP executive director Sonny Barrios announced that Reyes will return as head coach of Gilas.

Beyond coaching
Prior to his participation as coach, Reyes worked for the Purefoods Corporation in a corporate setting before being hired by Cone as Alaska's assistant. In 2003, Reyes established coachcom.inc, an executive and coaching company that helps develop coaching aspects in sports and in other fields such as business.

He also in 1998, Reyes appeared as a color commentator of the Metropolitan Basketball Association's coverage on Studio 23 it has been produced by ABS-CBN Sports during its maiden season of the league.

He has also appeared as a color commentator for the PBA on ABC coverage. During his time as Purefoods head coach, he would appear in several coverages as a guest colleague, a time when Vintage practices inviting PBA coaches and assistants to do commentary. At some time in 2005 and 2006, Reyes appeared for ABC Sports as a pre-game, halftime, and post-game analyst during a game in two finals series.

Reyes has four children with his wife Cherry. He is the older brother of former PBA player John Gilbert "Jun–Jun" Reyes, Jr., who played for Pepsi and Alaska, and of Mike Reyes, who is also a basketball coach, coaching for the Southwestern University PHINMA Cobras in the Cebu Schools Athletic Foundation, Inc. (CESAFI). He is also the uncle of Ateneo Blue Eagle point guard, Jai Reyes, whom he also at Talk 'N Text during the 2013–14 PBA season. During his high school and collegiate years, he was a member of the Ateneo de Manila basketball team.

Reyes was a former member and the only Filipino in the International Advisory Board of the United States Basketball Academy, and was also a member of the Board of the Basketball Coaches Association of the Philippines. He is a degree holder in Interdisciplinary Studies from the Ateneo de Manila University and a Masters in Business Administration student at the Edinburgh Business School in Scotland, United Kingdom.

References

External links
Coca-Cola Tigers Official Site
San Miguel Beermen Unofficial fansite

1963 births
Living people
Academic staff of Ateneo de Manila University
Filipino men's basketball coaches
TNT Tropang Giga coaches
Philippines men's national basketball team coaches
Basketball players from Quezon City
TV5 Network executives
Ateneo Blue Eagles men's basketball players
Ateneo Blue Eagles men's basketball coaches
Sta. Lucia Realtors coaches
Magnolia Hotshots coaches
Powerade Tigers coaches
San Miguel Beermen coaches